Anti-Facebook may refer to:
Criticism of Facebook
Social networking services describing themselves as the "anti-Facebook":
MeWe, founded in 2012
Minds, founded in 2011